Guelph United Football Club is a Canadian semi-professional soccer club based in Guelph, Ontario that plays in League1 Ontario.  The women's team is known as Guelph Union and competes in the League1 Ontario women's division. Both teams play at the University of Guelph's Alumni Stadium.

History
Both the men's (Guelph United) and women's (Guelph Union) teams were formed in 2020, joining League1 Ontario in 2021, initially under separate ownership groups, with both being affiliated with the Guelph Soccer Club. In January 2023, the club's merged under the same ownership group with Guelph United acquiring the Union, in a move to optimize operations and strengthen ties with the community (the women's team will still continue to operate under the name Guelph Union).

Men

Guelph United F.C. was founded in 2020 by Keith Mason, Benny Mezezi, and Ami Mezezi, in partnership with the University of Guelph Gryphons, the Guelph Soccer Club, and the City of Guelph with the goal of bringing semi-professional soccer to the community. Guelph Gryphons head and assistant coaches Keith Mason and Justin Springer were announced as the team's associate coaches. The team is expected to be primarily composed of University of Guelph players, supplemented by local players.

The club joined League1 Ontario for the 2021 season and will also field a team in the reserve division. Ahead of their debut, they made headlines signing former Canadian Premier League player Jace Kotsopoulos as the team's first ever player. They made their debut on July 30, 2021 defeating FC London by a score of 6-0. In their first season, they came in first place in the West Division, advancing to the playoffs, with their team featuring three of the top four regular season goal scoring leaders. In the playoffs, they won the League1 Ontario title, after defeating Blue Devils FC 3-1 in the finals, qualifying them for the 2022 Canadian Championship. They were defeated in the first round of the Canadian Championship by professional club HFX Wanderers FC of the Canadian Premier League 2-0.

Women
Guelph Union was founded by the Guelph Soccer Club to join the League1 Ontario women's division for the 2021 season. They became the city's first ever women's semi-professional sports team. The women's team initially existed as a separate entity from the men's team, although they merged into one entity (while retaining the Union name for the women's team) in January 2023, as the women's team was potentially going to leave the city, as they would not be returning under the Guelph SC banner. Prior to this the Guelph Soccer Club had fielded four teams in the Ontario Women's Soccer League. They made their debut in the 2021 Summer Championship season on July 22, 2021, defeating Darby FC 1-0. The club partnered with the Children’s Foundation of Guelph and Wellington as their charitable partner, donating fifty percent of the revenue from their ticket sales to the organization. In their debut season, they participated in the short-season Summer Championship division, finishing with a perfect 6-0 record to win the division. In 2022, they began playing in the main division (after opting to play in the short-season division in 2021 due to the COVID-19 pandemic), winning their debut match 1-0 over Darby FC. They finished their inaugural season in the main division in 13th place.

Players and staff

Coaching staff
as of March 30, 2021

Seasons

Guelph United

Guelph Union

Notable former players
The following players have either played at the professional or international level, either before or after playing for the League1 Ontario team:

Men

Women

External links
Guelph United F.C. (men) website
Guelph Union (women) website

References

Association football clubs established in 2020
Soccer clubs in Ontario
League1 Ontario teams
Sport in Guelph
2020 establishments in Ontario